Euclasta warreni is a moth in the family Crambidae. It was described by William Lucas Distant in 1892. It is found in the Democratic Republic of the Congo, Ethiopia, South Africa, Zimbabwe, and Mali.

References

Moths described in 1892
Pyraustinae